Košarkaški klub Leotar, commonly referred to as KK Leotar or Leotar Trebinje, is a men's professional basketball club based in Trebinje, Republika Srpska, Bosnia and Herzegovina. They are currently competing in the Bosnia and Herzegovina Championship.

History
The club is formed in 1948 as DTV Partizan and renamed as KK Leotar in 1974 after the mountain located just north of Trebinje.

The club won the First League of Republika Srpska in the 2018–19 season and got promoted to Bosnia and Herzegovina Championship for the 2019–20 season.

Sponsorship naming
The club has had several denominations through the years due to its sponsorship:
 SL IAT Leotar (2008–2011)
 SL Takovo Leotar (2011–2012)
 Swisslion Leotar (2015–2017)

Home arena
Leotar plays its home games at the Miloš Mrdić Sports Hall. The hall is located in the Bregovi Neighbourhood in Trebinje. It has a seating capacity of 4,000 seats.

Players

Current roster

Head coaches 

  Rade Aleksić 
  Aleksandar Glišić (2006–2007)
  Petar Rodić (2007)
  Miroslav Popov (2007–2008)
  Radomir Kisić (2008–2012)
  Marko Ičelić (2013–2014)
  Dragoljub Vidačić (2014–2016)
  Vuk Stanimirović
  Dražen Šegrt (2018–2019)
  Miro Vukoje (2019–2021)
  Marko Ičelić (2021–present)

Trophies and awards
First League of Republika Srpska (2nd-tier)
Winners  (2): 2002–03, 2018–19

See also 
 FK Leotar (football club)

References

External links
 
 Profile at sportsport.ba
 Profile at eurobasket.com
 Profile at realgm.com

Leotar
Leotar
Leotar
Leotar
Trebinje